Suleyman al-Boustani (Arabic: سليمان البـسـتاني / ALA-LC: Sulaymān al-Bustānī, ; 1856–1925) was born in Bkheshtin, Lebanon. 

He was a statesman, teacher, poet and historian. 
He was a Maronite Catholic and hailed from a prominent family well known for their pioneering contributions to the Arab renaissance of the late 19th century known as Nahda. 

A nephew of Butrus al-Bustani, he was famous for translating Homer's Iliad into Arabic, introducing its poetic style into the Arabic language. 
His political front saw him as the minister of finance in the last Ottoman government before its collapse.

References

Arabs from the Ottoman Empire
Lebanese translators
1856 births
1925 deaths
Lebanese expatriates in Egypt
Lebanese Maronites